The United States Olympic team trials in gymnastics are held before every Summer Olympic Games to select the participants for the US Olympic gymnastics team. The event is overseen by the United States Olympic Committee and run by USA Gymnastics.

The first Olympic trials were held in 1960 in West Point, New York, to select athletes for the 1960 Summer Olympics in Rome, Italy. The men's and women's trials have been held both separately and as one event. Many of the results are hard to come by as they weren't recorded or published to the public.

Editions

See also
American Cup
USA National Championships
U.S. Classic
Winter Cup
Gymnastics at the Summer Olympics

References

Gymnastics competitions in the United States
Gymnastics
Recurring sporting events established in 1960